Américo Bonetti (22 April 1928 – 14 June 1999) was an Argentine boxer. He competed in the men's lightweight event at the 1952 Summer Olympics.

References

External links
 

1928 births
1999 deaths
Argentine male boxers
Olympic boxers of Argentina
Boxers at the 1952 Summer Olympics
Sportspeople from Santa Fe, Argentina
Lightweight boxers